Arthur Edward Jeune "James" Collins (18 August 1885 – 11 November 1914) was an English cricketer and soldier, most famous for his achievement as a schoolboy of what was, for 116 years, the highest-ever recorded score in cricket—628 not out, scored over four afternoons in June 1899. Collins's record-making innings drew a large crowd and increasing media interest: spectators at the Old Cliftonian match being played nearby were drawn away to watch a junior school house cricket match. Collins's record score was never matched until 2016, when Pranav Dhanawade scored 1009 not out.

Scorecard

Clark's House – 1st Innings 

Fall of wickets: 1-127, 2-169, 3-226, 4-268, 5-311, 6-436, 7-451, 8-?, 9-698, 10-836.

Notes:
 Collins' 628* in 6 hours 50 minutes, 1 x 6, 4 x 5, 31 x 4, 33 x 3, 146 x 2, 87 x 1.
 Collins was dropped on the following scores: 80, 100, 140, 400, 556, 605 and 619.

North Town – 1st Innings

North Town – 2nd Innings 

Clark's House wins by an innings and 688 runs.

Cricket records and statistics
1899 in English cricket
Schools cricket matches